Ingvald Conrad Thoresen (1852 – April 15, 1938) was a member of the Utah House of Representatives from 1898 to 1900.

Thoresen was born in Oslo, Norway. His parents joined the Church of Jesus Christ of Latter-day Saints (LDS Church) in 1855, and his father baptized a few hundred people into the church over the next few years. His father was put in prison on multiple occasions for these actions as they were regarded as an affront to the official Lutheran Church of Norway.

Thoresen migrated with his family to Utah Territory in 1863 and settled in Hyrum. From 1876 to 1878, he was a missionary of the LDS Church in Sweden and Denmark. Over the years, Thoresen served as mayor of Hyrum and as a county prosecutor. He was a delegate to Utah's 1882, 1887 and 1895 Constitutional Conventions. Thoresen was elected as a Democrat to the state legislature and was heavily involved in promoting the Democratic Party in the state.

Sources
Andrew Jenson.  Latter-day Saint Biographical Encyclopedia. Salt Lake City, Utah: Andrew Jenson, 1901. vol. 1, p. 430–31.

1852 births
19th-century Mormon missionaries
Mormon missionaries in Denmark
Mormon missionaries in Sweden
Norwegian Latter Day Saints
Norwegian Mormon missionaries
Norwegian emigrants to the United States
Mayors of places in Utah
Democratic Party members of the Utah House of Representatives
People from Hyrum, Utah
1938 deaths